Klaus Bringmann  (28 May 1936, in Bad Wildungen – 14 July 2021) was a German historian, an author of books on Roman history, and a professor of antiquity.

Biography 
Bringmann studied from 1956 to 1962 history, classical philology and philosophy at the Universities of Marburg and Munich. He received his doctorate in 1962 at the University of Marburg in 1969 and became a professor at the University of Marburg with investigations into the late Cicero. Since 1971, Bringmann taught Classics at the Philipps-University Marburg, and from 1973 ancient history at the Technische Hochschule Darmstadt. Bringmann has three sons and has been married since 1965. Since 1988 until his retirement in 2000 he taught as emeritus professor of Ancient History at the Johann Wolfgang Goethe University in Frankfurt where he held a chair of ancient history. In 1987/88 and 1993/94 he was a visiting scientist at the Institute for Advanced Study in Princeton. Bringmann has since 1988 been a member of the German Archaeological Institute.

The main research areas of Bringmann lie in Roman history of the republic to late antiquity, the history of Hellenism, of Jewish history in the Hellenistic and Roman times and the history of Christianity in the Roman Empire. He also led with the professor of Classical Archaeology Hans von Steuben, the project "donations Hellenistic ruler of Greek cities and sanctuaries." Later he was a director of the interdisciplinary research program "Knowledge Culture and Social Change." Bringmann was a holder of the Professorship of Ancient History at the Technische Universität Darmstadt.

Works 
Roman history. From the beginnings to late antiquity. Oxford University Press, first Edition, Munich 1995; 10 Edition 2008, 
 Storia romana, Il Mulino, Italian edition, Bologna 1998,  .
History of the Roman Republic. From the beginning to Augustus. CH Beck, Munich 2002, 
 A History of the Roman Republic, English Translation, Polity Press, Cambridge 2007,  .
Augustus and the establishment of the Roman Empire, Akademie-Verlag, Berlin 2002, 
Crisis and the end of the Roman Republic (133–42 BC). Akademie-Verlag, Berlin 2003, 
Emperor Julian. The last pagan ruler. Scientific Paper Company / Primus Verlag, Darmstadt 2004, 
 Juliano, Herder Editorial, Barcelona 2006,  .Augustus. Scientific Paper Company / Primus Verlag, Darmstadt, 2007, Augusto, Herder Editorial: Barcelona 2008, Cicero'', Routledge, Darmstadt, 2010

References

External links 
 WorldCat identifies Bringmann with 66 works in 163 publications in 8 languages and 2,277 library holdings

20th-century German historians
1936 births
2021 deaths
University of Marburg alumni
Academic staff of the University of Marburg
Experimental physicists
Ludwig Maximilian University of Munich alumni
People from Bad Wildungen
People from Hesse-Nassau
Academic staff of Goethe University Frankfurt
German male non-fiction writers
Recipients of the Cross of the Order of Merit of the Federal Republic of Germany
Historians of ancient Rome
21st-century German historians